Abrázame Muy Fuerte (English: Hold Me Tightly) is the 25th studio album recorded by Mexican singer-songwriter Juan Gabriel. It was released by BMG U.S. Latin on December 12, 2000 (see 2000 in music). The title track is the theme song for the Mexican telenovela Abrázame Muy Fuerte (2000–2001), produced by Salvador Mejía Alejandre, Victoria Ruffo, Fernando Colunga and Aracely Arámbula starred as the protagonists, while César Évora, Nailea Norvind, Helena Rojo and Rossana San Juan, portrayed the antagonists. In 2002, the album was awarded at the Premio Lo Nuestro for Pop Album of the Year and was nominated for a Grammy Award for Best Latin Pop Album in the 44th Annual Grammy Awards.

Track listing

Personnel 

Antonio Alvarado – vocals
Ricardo Cortez  – producer
Valério Do Carmo – graphic design
Juan Gabriel – vocals
Luigie "LUGO" Gonzalez – Producer/Engineer
Enrique Okamura – production coordination
Bebu Silvetti – producer
César Vera – photography
German Villacorta – engineer

Sales and certifications

References

External links 
 
 Abrázame Muy Fuerte on amazon.com
 Abrázame Muy Fuerte on cduniverse.com

2000 albums
Juan Gabriel albums
Spanish-language albums
RCA Records albums
Albums produced by Bebu Silvetti